Sandvika may refer to the following locations:

Places
Sandvika, the administrative centre of Bærum municipality in Viken county, Norway
Sandvika Station, a railway station in Sandvika in Bærum municipality in Viken county, Norway
Sandvika Storsenter, a regional mall in Sandvika in Bærum municipality in Viken county, Norway
Sandvika Tunnel, a road tunnel in Sandvika in Bærum municipality in Viken county, Norway
Sandvika, Agder, a village in Tvedestrand municipality in Agder county, Norway
Sandvika, Frøya, a village in Frøya municipality in Trøndelag county, Norway
Sandvika, Innlandet, a village in Stange municipality in Innlandet county, Norway
Sandvika, Lierne, a village in Lierne municipality in Trøndelag county, Norway
Sandvika, Nordland, a village in Gildeskål municipality in Nordland county, Norway

See also
Sandvik (disambiguation)
Sandviken (disambiguation)